2-Aminobenzaldehyde is an organic compound with the formula C6H4(NH2)CHO.  It is one of three isomers of aminobenzaldehyde. It is a low-melting yellow solid that is soluble in water.

Preparation and reactions
It is usually prepared by reduction of 2-nitrobenzaldehyde with iron or iron(II) sulfate.  Like related aminoaldehydes, it is unstable with respect to self-condensation.

2-Aminobenzaldehyde is used to prepare quinolines by the Friedländer synthesis:

By template reactions, it also forms trimeric and tetrameric condensation products that have been studied as ligands.

References

Benzaldehydes
Amines